Hazleton or Haselton is a village and civil parish in the Cotswold District of Gloucestershire, England. The population of the civil parish at the 2011 Census was 224. Hazleton was recorded in the Domesday Book (1086) as Hasedene.

Hazleton Abbey was formed in the 12th century. The former Abbey barn survives. Hazelton Manor was built on the site in the 16th century.

See also
Hazleton long barrows

References

External links

Villages in Gloucestershire
Civil parishes in Gloucestershire
Cotswold District